The Ledbetter House (also known as the Ledbetter/Taylor House) is a historic house located at 701 West Brooks in Norman, Oklahoma, United States.

Description
It was built in 1948, and was designed by architect Bruce Goff. The distinguishing features of the house are its suspended carport and patio roofs. The Ledbetter House is owned by the University of Oklahoma and is now a private residence. In 2001, it was one of several Goff-designed buildings recognized by placement on the National Register of Historic Places.

References

External links
National Register of Historic Places nomination form

Houses completed in 1948
Houses on the National Register of Historic Places in Oklahoma
University of Oklahoma campus
Bruce Goff buildings
Expressionist architecture
Organic architecture
Houses in Cleveland County, Oklahoma
National Register of Historic Places in Cleveland County, Oklahoma